Cibo is an Italian restaurant in Portland, Oregon.

Description 

Cibo (pronounced chee-bo; Italian for food) is an Italian restaurant in southeast Portland's Richmond neighborhood. The 2,000-square-foot space has a bar, an open kitchen with an imported Ligurian pizza oven, red leather booths, and wrap-around windows.

Erin DeJesus of Eater Portland said the restaurant was "designed around the concept of the cecina, a topped chickpea flatbread, and hand-pulled pizzas". The menu has also included stromboli, charcuterie, baked fish, and Pax romana sausage with foccaccia, relish, and house mustard. Other dishes have included bolognese, polenta lasagne, bacon-wrapped quail, and pan-seared trout with prosciutto and sage.

History 
Owner Marco Frattaroli confirmed plans to open Cibo in January 2012. Originally slated to open in April, the restaurant's launch was pushed back to mid May, then June 26, before finally debuting on July 3.

Reception 

Samantha Bakall ranked Cibo number 15 in The Oregonian's 2017 list of "Portland's 27 best wood-fired pizzas", in which she described the restaurant as a " neighborhood favorite". Zuri Anderson included Cibo in iHeart Media's 2021 overview of Portland's "highest-rated" pizza restaurants, based on Tripadvisor reviews.

Alex Frane included Cibo in Eater Portland 2022 list of "15 Stellar Italian Restaurants in Portland". He wrote, "the mistake could be made that Cibo is more of a pizzeria and bar than full Italian restaurant. But the small-but-solid pasta list and Italian wine menu elevate the restaurant to a more full-fledged Italian eatery, while still being a more casual, weeknight or special occasion kind of venture. Still, the thin, char-kissed wood-fired pizzas are the main draw, especially the signature margherita."

See also 

 List of Italian restaurants

References

External links 

 
 Cibo at Zomato

2012 establishments in Oregon
Italian restaurants in Portland, Oregon
Restaurants established in 2012
Richmond, Portland, Oregon